John Mapson (2 May 1917 – 19 August 1999) was an English professional footballer.

Born in Birkenhead, Cheshire, Mapson moved to Swindon in his youth and worked in a succession of jobs including grocer's boy, in a bakehouse and as a milk boy before signing for Reading in April 1935. In March 1936 he transferred to Sunderland for the sum of £2,000, beginning a career with Sunderland that would last for nearly twenty years.

The death of goalkeeper Jimmy Thorpe on 5 February 1936 propelled the 18-year-old Mapson, with only a couple of Third Division appearances for Reading, into the championship-chasing Sunderland first team. Sunderland won the Football League Championship in 1936, although Mapson did not make enough appearances to qualify for a medal. The following season Mapson established himself as a first team regular as Sunderland won the 1936 FA Charity Shield and the 1937 FA Cup Final, the latter played on the eve of Mapson's 20th birthday.

Mapson was considered positionally astute as a goalkeeper, rarely having to make a last-ditch dive and had a distinctive method of catching the ball (one arm over the other to one side of his body).

Mapson's career was interrupted by World War II, during which he worked in an engineering works, assisting Reading in wartime football and helping them to win the London War Cup in 1941.

Following the end of the war, Mapson returned as first choice goalkeeper for Sunderland in an increasingly star-studded team during the so-called "Bank of England club" era of the early 1950s, so named as the club broke successive transfer records to buy and field a team of established internationals. Although ultimately unsuccessful in winning honours, the Sunderland team at this time was one of the great glamour sides of the era, fielding players of the quality of Len Shackleton and Trevor Ford.

In 1939 Mapson travelled with the Football Association touring party to South Africa, playing against the national side, and in 1941 played for England against Wales in a wartime international.

Mapson retired in May 1954 and lived with his daughter in Washington until his death on 19 August 1999. At the time of his death he was the last surviving member of Sunderland's 1937 FA Cup winning team.

References

Johnny Mapson, Post War English & Scottish Football League A - Z Player's Transfer Database

1917 births
Sportspeople from Birkenhead
1999 deaths
English footballers
Association football goalkeepers
Reading F.C. players
Reading F.C. wartime guest players
Brentford F.C. wartime guest players
Sunderland A.F.C. players
England wartime international footballers
FA Cup Final players